Blatchley Hall, on the campus of the College of Idaho in Caldwell in Canyon County, Idaho, was built in 1910.  It was listed on the National Register of Historic Places in 1978. It was deemed significant as a good "example of the Colonial revival" and for its association with the history of The College of Idaho.

Dr. William Judson Boone, who founded the college in 1891, lived there for a short time. It was later remodeled to serve as a Y.M.C.A. and then again later to serve as the college's music building and art gallery.

See also
 Sterry Hall
 Strahorn Hall

References

External links

University and college buildings on the National Register of Historic Places in Idaho
Colonial Revival architecture in Idaho
Buildings and structures completed in 1910
Canyon County, Idaho